Dhuen Ki Lakeer is a 1974 Bollywood drama film directed by Kishore Sahu. The film stars Ramesh Arora and Parveen Babi.

Cast
Ramesh Arora   
Parveen Babi   
Urmila Bhatt   
Preeti Ganguli

Songs
"Daur Wo Aa Gaya, Dil Ke Armaa Bike, Hosle Bik Gaye" - Mohammed Rafi
"Teree Jhil See Geharee Aankho Me" - Vani Jairam, Nitin Mukesh
"Ek Shama Jale Kahan, Parvano Ki Bhid Yaha" - Ajit Singh, Krishna]]
"Gauri Ke Maang Mein Sindoor, Kahi Dur Baje Shanai" - Ghanshyamji, Shamji
"Ik Abla Ik Maa Bik Gayi Daur Wo Aa Gaya ( Part II )" - Mohammed Rafi

External links
 

1974 films
1970s Hindi-language films
1974 drama films
Films directed by Kishore Sahu